Shahid Iqbal Choudhary is a 2009 batch Indian Administrative Service officer from Jammu and Kashmir cadre and the current Administrative Secretary of Tribal Affairs Department and  Chief Executive Officer, J&K Mission Youth, Mission Director, Skill Development Mission, Jammu & Kashmir. He secured an All India Rank 51 in the UPSC's Civil Services Examination for the year 2008. Shahid was the first Muslim from Jammu region and first Gurjar from J&K to get into Indian Administrative Service as a direct recruit from IAS.

Early life and education 
Shahid Iqbal Choudhary was born in Rehan village of Rajouri. He did his early schooling from his native village.

Career 
Shahid did his graduation in B.V.Sc & A.H from Sher-e-Kashmir University of Agricultural Sciences and Technology of Jammu and post graduation in MSc Natural Resource Management from FRI University, Dehradhun. Soon after completing post graduation, he qualified for Indian Forest Service in 2005 and served as forest officer in Kashmir valley. In the year of 2008 he appeared for UPSC and qualified with a rank of 51.Presently serving as Secretary, Tribal Affairs, J&K Government| CEO Mission Youth J&K| MD Skill Development | Livelihood initiatives, Jammu and Kashmir. He served as District Development Commissioner/District Magistrate (DM), Srinagar, Additional Secretary in Chief Minister Office J&K/ Director Information &PR and Managing Director J&K Tourism Development Corporation, DM Rajouri, DM Bandipora, DM Leh, DM Udhampur, DM Kathua, DM Reasi, Additional Secretary Planning & Development, Special Officer Relief & Reconstruction Leh and SDM Nowshera.

Awards and recognition
 National Award for Best Electoral conduct from Election Commission of India
 National Awards for e-Governance presented by Ministry of Personnel, Government of India
 Prime Minister’s Awards for Excellence in Public Administration
 National Award on women empowerment from Prime Minister Narendra Modi in the category "Enabling Girl Child Education" on International Women Day 2018.
 National Award for exceptional contribution in Education sector - 2019.

References 

Living people
People from Jammu and Kashmir
Indian Administrative Service officers
Year of birth missing (living people)